Prince William County Clerk of Circuit Court is an elected office in Prince William County, Virginia that dates back to the 1700s. The clerk serves an eight-year term, earns $162,740 a year, and has more than 800 responsibilities listed in the Code of Virginia.

In 2017, Jacqueline Smith and Virginia's 50th House of Delegates district delegate Jackson Miller ran in a special election for the office, to complete the term that ends in 2023. The election was won by Smith.

References

Prince William County, Virginia